Potamonautes pilosus is a species of crustacean in the family Potamonautidae. It is found in Kenya and Tanzania. Its natural habitat is rivers.

References

Potamoidea
Freshwater crustaceans of Africa
Taxa named by Franz Martin Hilgendorf
Crustaceans described in 1898
Taxonomy articles created by Polbot